Thomas Woschitz (born 22 April 1968, in Klagenfurt am Wörthersee) is an Austrian film director, screenwriter and film editor.

Life and work
Thomas Woschitz grew up in Austria and studied at the Centro Sperimentale di Cinematografia in Rome under Lina Wertmüller. After working as a film editor for feature films (he was nominated for a Silver Ribbon award for Best Editing for La Capa Gira, directed by Alessandro Piva), he went on to direct a series of short films that were screened at major film festivals: Girls and Cars (2004) was screened in the Semaine de la Critique section of the Cannes Film Festival.

His long collaboration with the Austrian indie band Naked Lunch led to the creation of the "film concert" Sperrstunde (2005), which was screened in competition at the Locarno Film Festival. In 2009 he was awarded the Max Ophüls Prize for his episodic music film Universalove, which also features music by the band Naked Lunch. His second feature film Bad Luck (2015), which stars Valerie Pachner, was praised for its tragic-comic nature and Woschitz's work with lay actors.

Filmography 
 1995: Tascheninhalt und Nasenbluten (short)
 1996: Blindgänger  (short)
 2004: Girls and Cars in a Colored New World (short)
 2005: Sperrstunde 
 2008: Universalove
 2015: Bad Luck

Awards 
 2009: Max Ophüls Prize for Universalove (2009)

References

External links 
 

Austrian film directors
1968 births
Living people